Lighthouse Board may refer to:

Northern Lighthouse Board, UK, formed in 1786
United States Lighthouse Board, formed in 1851
, formed in 1904
, formed in 1811